The 2021–22 NBL season was the 36th season for the Brisbane Bullets in the NBL.

Roster

Pre-season

Ladder

Game log 

|-style="background:#cfc;"
| 1
| 14 November
| @ Tasmania
| W 79–89
| Nathan Sobey (17)
| Franks, Sobey (7)
| Lamar Patterson (6)
| MyState Bank Arena4,500
| 1–0
|-style="background:#cfc;"
| 2
| 19 November
| Perth
| W 100–90
| Digbeu, Harrison, Patterson (16)
| Tyrell Harrison (9)
| Lamar Patterson (7)
| Ulverstone Sports & Leisure Centrenot available
| 2–0
|-style="background:#cfc;"
| 3
| 24 November
| @ Cairns
| W 86–94
| Nathan Sobey (27)
| Robert Franks (8)
| Nathan Sobey (8)
| Ulverstone Sports & Leisure Centrenot available
| 3–0
|-style="background:#fcc;"
| 4
| 28 November
| Adelaide
| L 67–72
| Tanner Krebs (15)
| Deng, Salt (9)
| Jason Cadee (3)
| MyState Bank Arenanot available
| 3–1

Regular season

Ladder

Game log 

|-style="background:#fcc;"
| 1
| 3 December
| @ Tasmania
| L 83–74 (OT)
| Nathan Sobey (24)
| Franks, Harrison (11)
| Lamar Patterson (6)
| MyState Bank Arena4,738
| 0–1
|-style="background:#cfc;"
| 2
| 12 December
| @ Perth
| W 94–97 (2OT)
| Lamar Patterson (27)
| Tyrell Harrison (14)
| Jason Cadee (7)
| RAC Arena11,295
| 1–1
|-style="background:#fcc;"
| 3
| 17 December
| @ Perth
| L 83–70
| Robert Franks (28)
| Robert Franks (9)
| Nathan Sobey (4)
| RAC Arena11,745
| 1–2
|-style="background:#cfc;"
| 4
| 19 December
| Illawarra
| W 96–92
| Nathan Sobey (17)
| Tyrell Harrison (8)
| Nathan Sobey (5)
| Nissan Arena3,584
| 2–2

|-style="background:#fcc;"
| 5
| 9 January
| New Zealand
| L 83–88
| Lamar Patterson (17)
| Robert Franks (9)
| Nathan Sobey (7)
| Nissan Arena2,925
| 2–3
|-style="background:#cfc;"
| 6
| 15 January
| S.E. Melbourne
| W 100–84
| Nathan Sobey (18)
| Robert Franks (10)
| Lamar Patterson (8)
| Nissan Arena2,389
| 3–3
|-style="background:#cfc;"
| 7
| 21 January
| Sydney
| W 96–87
| Nathan Sobey (30)
| Tyrell Harrison (13)
| Jason Cadee (5)
| Nissan Arena2,574
| 4–3
|-style="background:#fcc;"
| 8
| 23 January
| @ Sydney
| L 97–73
| Lamar Patterson (16)
| Franks, Patterson (8)
| Krebs, Sobey (3)
| Qudos Bank Arena4,237
| 4–4
|-style="background:#fcc;"
| 9
| 26 January
| Melbourne
| L 82–84
| Lamar Patterson (21)
| Robert Franks (8)
| Jason Cadee (4)
| Nissan Arena2,479
| 4–5
|-style="background:#fcc;"
| 10
| 29 January
| S.E. Melbourne
| L 73–88
| Lamar Patterson (26)
| Deng Deng (11)
| Lamar Patterson (5)
| Nissan Arena2,552
| 4–6

|-style="background:#fcc;"
| 11
| 5 February
| Cairns
| L 94–102
| Robert Franks (22)
| Tyrell Harrison (8)
| Jason Cadee (5)
| Nissan Arena2,695
| 4–7
|-style="background:#cfc;"
| 12
| 11 February
| Adelaide
| W 77–73
| Lamar Patterson (32)
| Drmic, Franks (5)
| Jason Cadee (9)
| Nissan Arena2,358
| 5–7
|-style="background:#fcc;"
| 13
| 13 February
| @ Sydney
| L 71–69
| Robert Franks (18)
| Robert Franks (9)
| Jason Cadee (6)
| Qudos Bank Arena5,543
| 5–8
|-style="background:#fcc;"
| 14
| 19 February
| @ S.E. Melbourne
| L 98–94
| Lamar Patterson (27)
| Robert Franks (8)
| Jason Cadee (8)
| John Cain Arena3,252
| 5–9
|-style="background:#fcc;"
| 15
| 24 February
| @ Cairns
| L 73–69
| Jason Cadee (15)
| Tyrell Harrison (7)
| Jason Cadee (8)
| Cairns Convention Centre2,853
| 5–10
|-style="background:#cfc;"
| 16
| 26 February
| Tasmania
| W 94–86
| Robert Franks (23)
| Robert Franks (11)
| Lamar Patterson (10)
| Nissan Arena2,683
| 6–10

|-style="background:#fcc;"
| 17
| 5 March
| @ Melbourne
| L 95–83
| Robert Franks (20)
| Cadee, Salt (5)
| Cadee, Patterson (5)
| John Cain Arena6,086
| 6–11
|-style="background:#cfc;"
| 18
| 7 March
| @ New Zealand
| W 74–92
| Robert Franks (23)
| Robert Franks (10)
| Jason Cadee (9) 
| MyState Bank Arenaclosed event
| 7–11
|-style="background:#fcc;"
| 19
| 12 March
| Perth
| L 83–95
| Robert Franks (21)
| Robert Franks (8)
| Lamar Patterson (8)
| Nissan Arena3,202
| 7–12
|-style="background:#fcc;"
| 20
| 20 March
| Cairns
| L 88–98
| Robert Franks (22)
| Robert Franks (10)
| Drmic, Patterson (4)
| Nissan Arena2,409
| 7–13
|-style="background:#cfc;"
| 21
| 24 March
| @ New Zealand
| W 100–101 (OT)
| Robert Franks (31)
| Robert Franks (12)
| Jason Cadee (11)
| Cairns Convention Centreclosed event
| 8–13
|-style="background:#fcc;"
| 22
| 26 March
| Tasmania
| L 82–84
| Robert Franks (21)
| Robert Franks (12)
| Lamar Patterson (6)
| Nissan Arena2,489
| 8–14
|-style="background:#fcc;"
| 23
| 31 March
| @ Illawarra
| L 87–70
| Digbeu, Franks (13)
| Robert Franks (13)
| Franks, Patterson (5)
| WIN Entertainment Centre2,262
| 8–15

|-style="background:#cfc;"
| 24
| 3 April
| Adelaide
| W 92–91
| Jason Cadee (26)
| Robert Franks (12)
| Jason Cadee (5)
| Nissan Arena3,280
| 9–15
|-style="background:#fcc;"
| 25
| 9 April
| Illawarra
| L 77–108
| Robert Franks (19)
| Lamar Patterson (6)
| Cadee, Digbeu (5)
| Nissan Arena3,652
| 9–16
|-style="background:#cfc;"
| 26
| 11 April
| @ Adelaide
| W 85–93
| Cadee, Digbeu, Patterson (15)
| Deng Deng (8)
| Anthony Drmic (4)
| Adelaide Entertainment Centre3,829
| 10–16
|-style="background:#fcc;"
| 27
| 16 April
| @ Melbourne
| L 88–79
| Lamar Patterson (23)
| Lamar Patterson (10)
| Jason Cadee (6)
| John Cain Arena5,721
| 10–17
|-style="background:#fcc;"
| 28
| 23 April
| @ Cairns
| L 112–98
| Robert Franks (30)
| Robert Franks (15)
| Cadee, Drmic (7)
| Cairns Convention Centre3,552
| 10–18

Transactions

Re-signed

Additions

Subtractions

Awards

Club awards 
 Young Player Award: Chuanxing Liu
 Defensive Player: Deng Deng
 Members MVP: Robert Franks
 Players Player Award: Jack Salt
 Club MVP: Robert Franks

See also 
 2021–22 NBL season
 Brisbane Bullets

References

External links 

 Official Website

Brisbane Bullets
Brisbane Bullets seasons
Brisbane Bullets season